Islam Chahrour (born 20 March 1990) is an Algerian footballer who plays as a defender for Qatari club Muaither.

Club career
Chahrour made his professional debut with Paradou AC in a 2-1 Algerian Ligue Professionnelle 1 loss to USM Alger on 26 August 2017.

On 20 July 2022, Chahrour joined Qatari club Muaither.

References

External links
 
 
 

1990 births
Living people
People from Chlef Province
Algerian footballers
Algerian expatriate footballers
Algeria international footballers
JSM Chéraga players
Paradou AC players
CS Constantine players
ASO Chlef players
Al-Kholood Club players
Muaither SC players
Algerian Ligue Professionnelle 1 players
Algerian Ligue 2 players
Saudi First Division League players
Qatari Second Division players
Expatriate footballers in Saudi Arabia
Algerian expatriate sportspeople in Saudi Arabia
Expatriate footballers in Qatar
Algerian expatriate sportspeople in Qatar
Association football defenders
21st-century Algerian people